This is a comprehensive list of victories of the  cycling team. The races are categorized according to the UCI Continental Circuits rules.

2007 – Astana Pro Team

Trofeo Soller, Antonio Colóm
 Overall Tirreno–Adriatico, Andreas Klöden
 Overall Circuit de la Sarthe, Andreas Klöden
Stage 3, Andreas Klöden
Prologue Tour de Romandie, Paolo Savoldelli
Stage 20 Giro d'Italia, Paolo Savoldelli
 Overall Tour de Luxembourg, Grégory Rast
Stage 4, Grégory Rast
Stage 3 & 7, Critérium du Dauphiné Libéré, Alexander Vinokourov
Stage 5 Critérium du Dauphiné Libéré, Antonio Colóm
Stage 6 Critérium du Dauphiné Libéré, Maxim Iglinsky
 Road Race Championship, Maxim Iglinsky
 Road Race Championship, Benoît Joachim
Stage 3 & 7 Herald Sun Tour, Aaron Kemps
Stage 4 & 6 Herald Sun Tour, Steve Morabito

2008 – Astana Pro Team

Stage 2 Volta ao Algarve, Tomas Vaitkus
 Overall Tour of California, Levi Leipheimer
Stage 5, Levi Leipheimer
Stage 2 Vuelta a Murcia, José Luis Rubiera
Ronde van het Groene Hart, Tomas Vaitkus
Overall Vuelta a Castilla y León, Alberto Contador
Stages 1 & 4, Alberto Contador
 Overall Vuelta al País Vasco, Alberto Contador
Stages 1 & 6, Alberto Contador
 Overall Tour de Romandie, Andreas Klöden
Stage 1, Maxim Iglinsky
Stage 3, Andreas Klöden
Overall  Giro d'Italia, Alberto Contador
Prologue Critérium du Dauphiné Libéré, Levi Leipheimer
 Road Race Championships, Assan Bazayev
 Time Trial Championships, Andrey Mizurov
 Road Race Championships, Serguei Ivanov
 Time Trial Championships, Vladimir Gusev
 Road Race Championships, Tomas Vaitkus
 Time Trial Championships, Sérgio Paulinho
Stage 5 Tour of Austria, René Haselbacher
 Overall Tour de Wallonie, Serguei Ivanov
Clásica a los Puertos de Guadarrama, Levi Leipheimer
Overall  Vuelta a España, Alberto Contador
Stages 5 & 20, Levi Leipheimer
Stages 13 & 14, Alberto Contador

2009 – Astana Pro Team

 Overall Tour of California, Levi Leipheimer
Stage 6, Levi Leipheimer
 Overall Volta ao Algarve, Alberto Contador
Stage 4, Alberto Contador
Stages 1 & 6 Paris–Nice, Alberto Contador
Stage 5 Tirreno–Adriatico, Andreas Klöden
Overall Vuelta a Castilla y León, Levi Leipheimer
Stage 2, Levi Leipheimer
 Overall Vuelta al País Vasco, Alberto Contador
Stages 3 & 6, Alberto Contador
Stage 1 Giro del Trentino, Andreas Klöden
Prologue Tour du Luxembourg, Grégory Rast
 Time Trial Championships, Janez Brajkovič
 Time Trial Championships, Alberto Contador
Overall  Tour de France, Alberto Contador
Stage 4, Team Time Trial
Stages 15 & 18, Alberto Contador
Chrono des Nations, Alexander Vinokourov
Team classification,  Tour de France
Team classification, Giro D'Italia

2010 – Astana Pro Team

 Overall Volta ao Algarve, Alberto Contador
Stage 3, Alberto Contador
Montepaschi Strade Bianche, Maxim Iglinsky
 Overall Paris–Nice, Alberto Contador
Stage 4, Alberto Contador
Stage 5 Tirreno–Adriatico, Enrico Gasparotto
Overall Vuelta a Castilla y León, Alberto Contador
Stage 4, Alberto Contador
 Overall Giro del Trentino, Alexander Vinokourov
Stage 1, Alexander Vinokourov
Liège–Bastogne–Liège, Alexander Vinokourov
Prologue & Stage 6 Critérium du Dauphiné, Alberto Contador
Stage 5 Critérium du Dauphiné, Daniel Navarro
 Road Race Championships, Gorazd Štangelj
 Road Race Championships, Maxim Gourov
Stage 13 Tour de France, Alexander Vinokourov
Alberto Contador originally finished 1st overall, but was later disqualified
Overall Tour of Hainan, Valentin Iglinsky
Stage 2, Valentin Iglinsky

2011 – Astana Pro Team

Stage 7 Paris–Nice, Rémy Di Gregorio
Stage 3 Tour of the Basque Country, Alexander Vinokourov
Stage 4 Giro del Trentino, Roman Kreuziger
Stage 2 Presidential Cycling Tour of Turkey, Valentin Iglinsky
Stage 3 Tour de Romandie, Alexander Vinokourov
Stage 19 Giro d'Italia, Paolo Tiralongo
 Young rider classification in the Giro d'Italia, Roman Kreuziger
 Road Race Championships, Andrey Mizurov
 Overall Tour of Austria, Fredrik Kessiakoff
Stage 2, Fredrik Kessiakoff
Overall Tour of Hainan, Valentin Iglinsky
Stage 8, Valentin Iglinsky

2012 – Astana Pro Team

 Road Race Championships, Tanel Kangert
 Road Race Championships, Assan Bazayev
 Road Race Championships, Borut Božič
 Road Race Championships, Andriy Hryvko
 Time Trial Championships, Dmitriy Gruzdev
 Time Trial Championships, Andriy Hryvko
Stage 3 Volta a Catalunya, Janez Brajkovič
Amstel Gold Race, Enrico Gasparotto
Liège–Bastogne–Liège, Maxim Iglinsky
 Overall Tour of Turkey, Alexsandr Dyachenko
Stage 3, Alexsandr Dyachenko
Stage 7 Giro d'Italia, Paolo Tiralongo
Stage 19 Giro d'Italia, Roman Kreuziger
 Overall Tour of Slovenia, Janez Brajkovič
Stage 1, Simone Ponzi
Stage 7 (ITT) Tour de Suisse, Fredrik Kessiakoff
Stage 9 Tour de Suisse, Tanel Kangert
Stage 11 (ITT) Vuelta a España, Fredrik Kessiakoff
Stage 3 Tour of Beijing, Francesco Gavazzi
Overall Tour of Hainan, Dmitriy Gruzdev
Stage 7, Dmitriy Gruzdev

2013 – Astana Pro Team

Stage 7 Tour de Langkawi, Andrea Guardini
 Overall Tirreno–Adriatico, Vincenzo Nibali
 Overall Giro del Trentino, Vincenzo Nibali
Stage 4, Vincenzo Nibali
 Overall Giro d'Italia, Vincenzo Nibali
Stages 18 (ITT) & 20, Vincenzo Nibali
Stage 4 Tour of Belgium, Maxim Iglinsky
 Time Trial Championships, Tanel Kangert
 Road Race Championships, Alexsandr Dyachenko
Stages 1 & 2 Tour of Austria, Kevin Seeldraeyers
Stage 1 Vuelta a Burgos, Simone Ponzi
Stage 1 Vuelta a España, Team time trial

2014 – Astana Pro Team

Stages 3 & 10 Tour de Langkawi, Andrea Guardini
Stage 7 Volta a Catalunya, Lieuwe Westra
Stage 4 Giro del Trentino, Mikel Landa
Stage 15 Giro d'Italia, Fabio Aru
Stage 7 Critérium du Dauphiné, Lieuwe Westra
 Time Trial Championships, Daniil Fominykh
 Road Race Championships, Vincenzo Nibali
 Overall Tour de France, Vincenzo Nibali
Stages 2, 10, 13 & 18, Vincenzo Nibali
Stages 2 & 4 Danmark Rundt, Andrea Guardini
Stage 5 (ITT) Danmark Rundt, Alexey Lutsenko
Stage 1 Eneco Tour, Andrea Guardini
Stages 11 & 18 Vuelta a España, Fabio Aru
Tour of Almaty, Alexey Lutsenko
Stage 3 Tour of Hainan, Arman Kamyshev

2015 – Astana Pro Team

Vuelta a Murcia, Rein Taaramäe
Stage 1 Tour of Oman, Andrea Guardini
Stages 1, 2, 4 & 8 Tour de Langkawi, Andrea Guardini
Stage 5 Tour of the Basque Country, Mikel Landa
Stage 4 Giro del Trentino, Paolo Tiralongo
Stage 2 Tour de Picardie, Andrea Guardini
Stage 9 Giro d'Italia, Paolo Tiralongo
Stage 1 World Ports Classic, Andrea Guardini
Stages 15 & 16 Giro d'Italia, Mikel Landa
Stages 19 & 20 Giro d'Italia, Fabio Aru
Team classification, Giro d'Italia
Stage 8 Tour de Suisse, Alexey Lutsenko
European Games Road Race, Luis León Sánchez
 Time Trial Championships, Alexey Lutsenko
 Road Race Championships, Vincenzo Nibali
Stage 19 Tour de France, Vincenzo Nibali
Stage 1 Danmark Rundt, Lars Boom
 Overall Vuelta a Burgos, Rein Taaramäe
Stage 2, Team time trial 
Stage 4, Miguel Ángel López
 Overall Arctic Race of Norway, Rein Taaramäe
 Overall Vuelta a España, Fabio Aru
Stage 11, Mikel Landa  
Coppa Bernocchi, Vincenzo Nibali 
Tre Valli Varesine, Vincenzo Nibali       
Milano–Torino, Diego Rosa       
Tour of Almaty, Alexey Lutsenko
Il Lombardia, Vincenzo Nibali 
Stage 1 Abu Dhabi Tour, Andrea Guardini
Stage 8 Tour of Hainan, Andrey Zeits

2016 – Astana Pro Team

Stage 6 Tour de San Luis, Miguel Ángel López
 Overall La Méditerranéenne, Andriy Hrivko
Stage 3, Andriy Hrivko
Stage 2 Volta ao Algarve, Luis León Sánchez
 Overall Tour of Oman, Vincenzo Nibali
Stage 4, Vincenzo Nibali
Stages 1, 5, 7 & 8 Tour de Langkawi, Andrea Guardini
Stage 4 Tour de Langkawi, Miguel Ángel López
Stage 5 Paris–Nice, Alexey Lutsenko
 Overall Three Days of De Panne, Lieuwe Westra
Stage 1 Tour of the Basque Country, Luis León Sánchez
Stage 5 Tour of the Basque Country, Diego Rosa
Stage 1 (TTT) Giro del Trentino
Stages 3 & 4 Giro del Trentino, Tanel Kangert
 Overall Giro d'Italia, Vincenzo Nibali
Stage 19, Vincenzo Nibali
Team classification
Stage 3 Critérium du Dauphiné, Fabio Aru
 Overall Tour de Suisse, Miguel Ángel López
 Time Trial Championships, Dmitriy Gruzdev
 Time Trial Championships, Gatis Smukulis
 Road Race Championships, Gatis Smukulis
 Road Race Championships, Arman Kamyshev
Stage 2 (TTT) Vuelta a Burgos
Milano–Torino, Miguel Ángel López
Tour of Almaty, Alexey Lutsenko
 Overall Abu Dhabi Tour, Tanel Kangert
Stage 3, Tanel Kangert
 Overall Tour of Hainan, Alexey Lutsenko
Stage 3 Tour of Hainan, Ruslan Tleubayev
Stage 8 Tour of Hainan, Alexey Lutsenko

2017 – Astana Pro Team

Stage 1 Tour of the Alps, Michele Scarponi
 Overall Critérium du Dauphiné, Jakob Fuglsang
Stages 6 & 8, Jakob Fuglsang
 Time Trial Championships, Zhandos Bizhigitov
 Road Race Championships, Artyom Zakharov
 Road Race Championships, Fabio Aru
Prologue Tour of Austria, Oscar Gatto
Stage 5 Tour de France, Fabio Aru
Stage 4 Tour of Austria, Miguel Ángel López
Stage 5 Vuelta a Burgos, Miguel Ángel López
Stage 5 Vuelta a España, Alexey Lutsenko
Stages 11 & 15 Vuelta a España, Miguel Ángel López

2018 – Astana Pro Team

Vuelta Ciclista a la Region de Murcia Costa Calida, Luis León Sánchez
 Overall Tour of Oman, Alexey Lutsenko
Stage 4, Magnus Cort Nielsen
Stage 5, Miguel Ángel López
Omloop Het Nieuwsblad, Michael Valgren
Stages 2 & 4 Tour de Langkawi, Riccardo Minali
Stage 5 Tour of the Basque Country, Omar Fraile
Amstel Gold Race, Michael Valgren 
Stage 1 Tour of the Alps, Pello Bilbao
Stage 2 Tour of the Alps, Miguel Ángel López
Stage 4 Tour of the Alps, Luis León Sánchez
 Youth classification Giro d'Italia, Miguel Ángel López
Stage 1 Tour de Romandie, Omar Fraile
Stage 2 Tour de Yorkshire, Magnus Cort Nielsen
Stage 6 Critérium du Dauphiné, Pello Bilbao
 National Time Trial Championships, Andrei Grivko
 National Time Trial Championships, Daniil Fominykh
 National Time Trial Championships, Tanel Kangert
 National Road Race Championships, Alexey Lutsenko
Stage 6 Tour of Austria, Alexey Lutsenko
Stage 14 Tour de France, Omar Fraile
Stage 15 Tour de France, Magnus Cort Nielsen
Stage 3 Vuelta a Burgos, Miguel Ángel López
Stage 5 BinckBank Tour, Magnus Cort Nielsen
 Overall Arctic Race of Norway, Sergei Chernetski
Asian Games Road Race, Alexey Lutsenko
  Overall Tour of Almaty, Davide Villella
Stage 1, Luis León Sánchez
Stage 2, Davide Villella
Stage 4 Presidential Cycling Tour of Turkey, Alexey Lutsenko

2019 – Astana Pro Team

 Overall Volta a la Comunitat Valenciana, Ion Izagirre
 Overall Vuelta Ciclista a la Region de Murcia Costa Calida, Luis León Sánchez
Stage 1, Pello Bilbao
Stage 2, Luis León Sánchez
 Overall Tour Colombia, Miguel Ángel López
 Overall Tour de la Provence, Gorka Izagirre
 Overall Tour of Oman, Alexey Lutsenko
Stages 2, 3 & 5, Alexey Lutsenko
 Overall Vuelta a Andalucía, Jakob Fuglsang
 Overall Tour of Rwanda, Merhawi Kudus
Stages 2 & 3, Merhawi Kudus
Stage 8, Rodrigo Contreras
Stage 4 Paris–Nice, Magnus Cort
Stage 4 Tirreno–Adriatico, Alexey Lutsenko
Stage 5 Tirreno–Adriatico, Jakob Fuglsang
Stage 8 Paris–Nice, Ion Izagirre
 Overall Volta a Catalunya, Miguel Ángel López
Stage 4, Miguel Ángel López
 Overall Tour of the Basque Country, Ion Izagirre
Liège–Bastogne–Liège, Jakob Fuglsang
 Youth classification Giro d'Italia, Miguel Ángel López
Stages 7 & 20 Giro d'Italia, Pello Bilbao
Stage 15 Giro d'Italia, Dario Cataldo
Stage 2 Tour de Suisse, Luis León Sánchez
 Overall Critérium du Dauphiné, Jakob Fuglsang
 Time Trial Championships, Alexey Lutsenko
 Road Race Championships, Alexey Lutsenko
European Games, Road Race, Davide Ballerini
 Overall Arctic Race of Norway, Alexey Lutsenko
Stage 1 (TTT) Vuelta a España
 Overall Tour of Almaty, Yuriy Natarov
Stage 16 Vuelta a España, Jakob Fuglsang
Coppa Sabatini, Alexey Lutsenko
Memorial Marco Pantani, Alexey Lutsenko
Stage 3 CRO Race, Yevgeniy Gidich

2020 – Astana Pro Team

Stage 2 Tour de la Provence, Aleksandr Vlasov 
Stage 2 Vuelta a Murcia, Luis León Sánchez
 Overall Vuelta a Andalucía, Jakob Fuglsang
Stages 1 & 3, Jakob Fuglsang
Stage 4 Volta ao Algarve, Miguel Ángel López
Gran Trittico Lombardo, Gorka Izagirre
Mont Ventoux Dénivelé Challenge, Aleksandr Vlasov 
Il Lombardia, Jakob Fuglsang
Giro dell'Emilia, Aleksandr Vlasov 
 National Road Race Championships, Luis León Sánchez
Memorial Marco Pantani, Fabio Felline
Stage 6 Tour de France, Alexey Lutsenko 
Stage 17 Tour de France, Miguel Ángel López 
Stage 6 Vuelta a España, Ion Izagirre

2021 – Astana–Premier Tech

Stage 2 Tour of the Basque Country, Alex Aranburu
Stage 4 Tour of the Basque Country, Ion Izagirre
Stage 4 (ITT) Critérium du Dauphiné, Alexey Lutsenko
 Time Trial Championships, Aleksandr Vlasov 
 Time Trial Championships, Ion Izagirre 
 Time Trial Championships, Matteo Sobrero 
 Road Race Championships, Yevgeniy Fedorov
 Road Race Championships, Omar Fraile 
 Time Trial Championships, Merhawi Kudus 
Prueba Villafranca – Ordiziako Klasika, Luis León Sánchez 
 Time Trial Championships, Hugo Houle
Coppa Ugo Agostoni, Alexey Lutsenko
Veneto Classic, Samuele Battistella

2022 – Astana Qazaqstan Team

Clásica Jaén, Alexey Lutsenko
Stage 4 Tour of the Alps, Miguel Ángel López
 Time Trial Championships, Yuriy Natarov
 Road Race Championships, Yevgeniy Gidich
Stage 1 Tour de Langkawi, Gleb Syritsa

2023 – Astana Qazaqstan Team

Stage 3 Volta a la Comunitat Valenciana, Simone Velasco

Supplementary statistics

References

Astana Qazaqstan Team
Astana